TEN Group may refer to
Ten Group, a British lifestyle concierge company
The Transforming Education in Norfolk Group, a federation of college and academy bodies formed around City College Norwich

See also
 Ten Network Holdings